Calabar Rovers FC are a Nigeria soccer team based in Calabar. They play their games at U. J. Esuene Stadium.

History
The club was founded in 1977. They were one of the original members of the Nigerian Second Division which was established in 1979. Under Brazilian coach Paulo Luiz Campos, they adopted a fast-paced style and were promoted after finishing second in 1981.

They stayed in the top flight for about a decade before being relegated to the lower leagues in 1993. During that time, they made the semifinals of the FA Cup twice but never won any major accolades.
Their last game however was the controversial 13–0 loss to Akwa United on August 12, 2006. Already doomed to relegation to the Nigeria Amateur League, Rovers had three players sent off in the blowout which allowed Akwa to be promoted to the Premier League by a goal differential of one. Rovers, on the other hand, disbanded after the game.

Return to Nigerian League
In May 2008, the Cross River State government announced plans to bring the team back from hiatus and with corporate sponsorship. With the help of United Cement Company (UNICEM), they entered into a player share agreement with newly promoted Dankat FC of Kano for 12 million naira, and will play in the Nigeria National League in 2008–09. Since the team also acquired Dankat's league slot, they played their first season back in the mostly-northern division A. The team was run for the next five seasons by UNICEM.
For part of the 2009 season they played at the Uyo Township Stadium while Esuene stadium was renovated for the 2009 FIFA U-17 World Cup.

Managers
 Dorian Marin (2017–19)
 Bob Osim (2019–)

References

External links
Paulo Campos Official Website
Calabar Rovers plan comeback
Rovers FC resurrects as Unicem-Rovers FC
Rovers will bounce back, says Osim
"We deserved the point"-Rovers
UNICEM Rovers defeat Mighty Jets

 
Association football clubs established in 1977
Football clubs in Nigeria
Calabar
1977 establishments in Nigeria
Sports clubs in Nigeria